The 'Bwe is an ethnic group present in Kayin State in Myanmar.  Bwe are mostly populated at Thandaunggyi Township of Kayin (Karen) state. 

Population 15,700 (1983).

Language development Literacy rate in L1: Below 1%. 

Bible portions: 1857–1862. 

They speak several languages, which included Karen, Karenni, and Burmese. They deported to Thailand because of civil war in Myanmar. They were separating from one another due to the dictatorship in Myanmar. They have a very strong connection and commitment to their country, language, culture and people. Bwe people are now locating in the Karenni Refugee camp at section 1. They are religious and mostly Baptists. They have been moving to the United States, Finland, Australia, and Canada since 2006. They came overseas for a better life and education.

See also
 List of ethnic groups in Burma

Ethnic groups in Myanmar